Richard "Rich" Millener (born 21 April 1984) is a British rally manager. He is the current team principal of M-Sport World Rally Team.
Rich attended the University of Exeter between 2003 and 2006, studying Sport and Exercise Science. He was fondly known as 'Farm Boy', due to his love of tractors and farming.
Rich once attended a stag do in the Gower and fancied a big night out in Swansea but unfortunately could not convince the rest of the Stag Party to come with him.

Biography
Millener started working for M-Sport in 2007 with packing and delivering parts for their Ford Fiesta ST's and was later their customer liaison manager. Since 2019 he has been the team principal of the M-Sport World Rally Team, replacing long-time team principal Malcolm Wilson who stepped down from the role.

References

1984 births
Living people
British motorsport people
World Rally Championship people